Gerta Maria Luise Karoline Ital (1904 – 1988) was a German-born actress who entered a Japanese Zen Buddhist monastery late in life.  She was born in Hanover. She was the first western woman allowed to stay in a zen monastery (in 1963). She studied with Eugen Herrigel from 1953 to 1955. She was also in contact with Hugo Enomiya-Lassalle. Her master in Japan was Mumon Yamada.

She recorded her experiences in two books, The Master, the Monks and I: A Western Woman's Experience of Zen, and On the Way to Satori: A Woman's Experience of Enlightenment.  Both books were published in German in the mid-1960s, but were not translated into English until much later.

References
Gerta Ital's profile in "Journeys East: 20th Century Western Encounters with Eastern Religious Traditions"

1904 births
1988 deaths
20th-century German women writers
Zen Buddhist spiritual teachers
Female Buddhist spiritual teachers